WMHC (91.5 FM) is a radio station licensed to serve South Hadley, Massachusetts.  The station is owned by Mount Holyoke College and licensed to the Trustees of Mount Holyoke College. It airs a college radio format. The station claims to be one of the oldest broadcasting facilities in the United States completely run by women.

The station was reassigned the WMHC call letters by the Federal Communications Commission on August 9, 1999, after having been deleted from the FCC database on April 30, 1999.

Their most recent logo, a hand-drawn cassette tape, was designed by Ariel Hahn.

References

External links
WMHC website

MHC
Mass media in Hampshire County, Massachusetts
Mount Holyoke College
Radio stations established in 1957
1957 establishments in Massachusetts